Sloy was a French indie rock band, formed in 1991 in Béziers and disbanded in 2000. They emerged thanks to the collaboration of Steve Albini, who produced their first albums.

Discography

Albums
1995 : Plug (prod. du Fer/Roadrunner, produced by Steve Albini)
1996 : Planet of Tubes (Tubes/Pias, produced by Steve Albini)
1998 : Electrelite (Tubes/Pias)

EPs
 Fuse - 1994, Rosebud
 Pop - 1995, Prod.du Fer/Roadrunner

References

External links
Sloy on Myspace

French indie rock groups
Musical groups from Occitania (administrative region)